Jeffery Earl Griffin (born July 19, 1958, in Carson, California) is a former American football defensive back in the National Football League for the St. Louis Cardinals and the Philadelphia Eagles.

Early career
Griffin played high school football at Banning High School in Wilmington, California.

He played college football at the University of Utah and was drafted in the third round of the 1981 NFL Draft.

References

1958 births
Living people
People from Carson, California
American football defensive backs
Utah Utes football players
St. Louis Cardinals (football) players
Philadelphia Eagles players
Players of American football from California
Sportspeople from Los Angeles County, California